This list of tunnels in Japan includes any road, rail or waterway tunnel in Japan.

See also
List of tunnels by location

Japan
 
Tunnels
Tunnels